Belval-Lycée railway station is a railway station serving the neighborhood of Belval, in the west of Esch-sur-Alzette, in southern Luxembourg. It opened on 29 September 2011. 'Lycée' refers to the school near the train station. The station is operated by CFL, the state-owned railway company.

The station is situated on Line 60, which connects Luxembourg City to the Red Lands of the south of the country.

The station also lies along a French-Luxembourgish hiking loop.

In 2017, Le Quotiden considered its recent addition, along with nearby Belval-Université, as partially to blame for increased CFL delays. By 2035, CFL expects to reduce the number of stations in the area by one.

References

External links
 Official CFL page on Belval-Lycée station 
 Rail.lu page on Belval-Lycée station 

Railway stations in Esch-sur-Alzette
Railway stations on CFL Line 60